Three Sisters Islands may refer to:

Three Sisters (District of Columbia), United States
Three Sisters Islands (New York), United States
Olu Malau Islands, Solomon Islands

See also
Three Sisters (disambiguation)
Sisters Islands (disambiguation)